Lamprobityle azurea is a species of beetle in the family Cerambycidae. It was described by Vives in 2012.

References

Apomecynini
Beetles described in 2012